KZKZ (729 kHz AM) was the second radio station in the Philippines. It began broadcasting in 1922 and was founded by Henry Hermann, the owner of the Electrical Supply Company in Manila. The station was upgraded in 1924 to a 100-watt station and its call letters, KZKZ, were adopted; at the time, stations in the Philippines carried U.S. call signs, though the United States Department of Commerce did not regulate them. Later that year, the station was sold to the Radio Corporation of the Philippines. Power was upgraded to 500 watts.

Radio Corporation of the Philippines merged with the Far Eastern Radio Corporation in September 1925. Far Eastern owned station KZRQ, which survived the merger while KZKZ was shuttered. In 1926, the organization began work on constructing two of the largest radio stations in Asia with the idea of maintaining direct Manila-San Francisco service.

References

External links
 Philippine Broadcast History

See also
DYRC
DZLT

Defunct radio stations in Metro Manila
Radio stations established in 1922
Radio stations disestablished in 1924
1922 establishments in the Philippines
1924 disestablishments in the Philippines